The scapulohumeral muscles are a group of seven muscles that connect the humerus to the scapula. They are amongst the muscles that act on and stabilise the glenohumeral joint in the human body.

They include :
coracobrachialis muscle
deltoid muscle
rotator cuff muscles :
infraspinatus muscle
subscapularis muscle
supraspinatus muscle
teres minor muscle
teres major muscle

See also
Other muscles that attach to the humerus and affect its rotation and stability :
latissimus dorsi muscle
pectoralis major muscle

Shoulder
Upper limb anatomy